José Vicente Fernández Biurrun (born 1 September 1959) is a Spanish former professional footballer who played as a goalkeeper.

He appeared in 296 La Liga matches over 14 seasons, in representation of four teams.

Club career
Born in São Paulo, Brazil, Biurrun was of Basque descent and moved to Spain at a young age. He started playing professionally with Real Sociedad (after appearing with the reserves in his senior beginnings) but, blocked by Spanish international Luis Arconada, he was forced to move and joined Navarrese neighbours CA Osasuna, being understudy to Francisco Vicuña in his first season and starting in the following two.

FC Barcelona took an option to purchase Biurrun, but in May 1986 they signed Athletic Bilbao's goalkeeper Andoni Zubizarreta instead and an agreement was reached for the former to join the Basque club as the latter's replacement. Deemed eligible to play for them due to his roots, he established himself as a La Liga player, rarely missing a match and playing a career-high 41 games in the 1986–87 campaign as his team finished in 13th position. Subsequently, he joined RCD Español as a replacement for the recently departed Thomas N'Kono.

Biurrun retired in 1995 at nearly 36 years of age after ending where he had started, Real Sociedad. He stayed connected with the game, as a players' agent.

References

External links

1959 births
Living people
Brazilian people of Spanish descent
Brazilian people of Basque descent
Footballers from São Paulo
Spanish footballers
Footballers from San Sebastián
Association football goalkeepers
La Liga players
Tercera División players
Real Sociedad B footballers
Real Sociedad footballers
CA Osasuna players
Athletic Bilbao footballers
RCD Espanyol footballers
Basque Country international footballers